In Greek mythology, the name Laodamia (Ancient Greek: Λαοδάμεια Laodámeia) referred to:

 Laodamia (or Hippodamia), a Lycian princess as the daughter of Bellerophon and Philonoe, daughter of King Iobates. Her mother was also known Alkimedousa, Anticleia, Pasandra or Cassandra. Laodamia's brothers were Hippolochus and Isander, and by Zeus, she became the mother of Sarpedon. She was shot by Artemis (that is, died a sudden, instant death) one day when she was weaving. Diodorus Siculus called her Deidamia, the wife of Evander, who was a son of Sarpedon the elder and by her father of Sarpedon the younger. Xanthus was also called the father of Sarpedon according to one account.
Laodamia, daughter of Acastus and Astydameia and the wife of Protesilaus. When her husband fell in the Trojan War, Laodamia committed suicide rather than be without him.
 Laodamia or Leaneira, an Arcadian queen as the wife of King Arcas by whom she became the mother of Elatus, Apheidas and Triphylus. Laodamia was the daughter of King Amyclas of Sparta and Diomede, daughter of Lapithes. Through this parentage, she was considered the sister of Argalus, Cynortes, Hyacinthus, Polyboea, Hegesandra and, in other versions, of Daphne.
 Laodamia, daughter of Alcmaeon, wife of Peleus and mother by him of Polydora. But see Antigone.
 Laodamia, wife of Anticlus. Her husband was one of the men who were hiding in the Trojan Horse.
 Laodamia or Laodice, alternate name for Iphthime, daughter of Icarius of Sparta and Asterodia, daughter of Eurypylus. She was the sister of Amasichus, Phalereus, Thoon, Pheremmelias and Perilaos.
 Laodamia or Arsinoe, nurse of Orestes. She saved his life by sending him to Strophius after the murder of Agamemnon, whereas Aegisthus killed her own son, taking him for Orestes.
Laodamia, alternate name for Hippodamia (wife of Pirithous) occurring in a red-figure vase painting.

Notes

References 

 Apollodorus, The Library with an English Translation by Sir James George Frazer, F.B.A., F.R.S. in 2 Volumes, Cambridge, MA, Harvard University Press; London, William Heinemann Ltd. 1921. ISBN 0-674-99135-4. Online version at the Perseus Digital Library. Greek text available from the same website.
Dictys Cretensis, from The Trojan War. The Chronicles of Dictys of Crete and Dares the Phrygian translated by Richard McIlwaine Frazer, Jr. (1931-). Indiana University Press. 1966. Online version at the Topos Text Project.
 Diodorus Siculus, The Library of History translated by Charles Henry Oldfather. Twelve volumes. Loeb Classical Library. Cambridge, Massachusetts: Harvard University Press; London: William Heinemann, Ltd. 1989. Vol. 3. Books 4.59–8. Online version at Bill Thayer's Web Site
 Diodorus Siculus, Bibliotheca Historica. Vol 1-2. Immanel Bekker. Ludwig Dindorf. Friedrich Vogel. in aedibus B. G. Teubneri. Leipzig. 1888–1890. Greek text available at the Perseus Digital Library.
 Gaius Julius Hyginus, Fabulae from The Myths of Hyginus translated and edited by Mary Grant. University of Kansas Publications in Humanistic Studies. Online version at the Topos Text Project.
 Homer, The Iliad with an English Translation by A.T. Murray, Ph.D. in two volumes. Cambridge, MA., Harvard University Press; London, William Heinemann, Ltd. 1924. Online version at the Perseus Digital Library.
 Homer, Homeri Opera in five volumes. Oxford, Oxford University Press. 1920. Greek text available at the Perseus Digital Library.
 Parthenius, Love Romances translated by Sir Stephen Gaselee (1882-1943), S. Loeb Classical Library Volume 69. Cambridge, MA. Harvard University Press. 1916.  Online version at the Topos Text Project.
 Parthenius, Erotici Scriptores Graeci, Vol. 1. Rudolf Hercher. in aedibus B. G. Teubneri. Leipzig. 1858. Greek text available at the Perseus Digital Library.
 Pausanias, Description of Greece with an English Translation by W.H.S. Jones, Litt.D., and H.A. Ormerod, M.A., in 4 Volumes. Cambridge, MA, Harvard University Press; London, William Heinemann Ltd. 1918. . Online version at the Perseus Digital Library
Pausanias, Graeciae Descriptio. 3 vols. Leipzig, Teubner. 1903.  Greek text available at the Perseus Digital Library.
 Pindar, Odes translated by Diane Arnson Svarlien. 1990. Online version at the Perseus Digital Library.
 Pindar, The Odes of Pindar including the Principal Fragments with an Introduction and an English Translation by Sir John Sandys, Litt.D., FBA. Cambridge, MA., Harvard University Press; London, William Heinemann Ltd. 1937. Greek text available at the Perseus Digital Library.
 Pseudo-Clement, Recognitions from Ante-Nicene Library Volume 8, translated by Smith, Rev. Thomas. T. & T. Clark, Edinburgh. 1867. Online version at theio.com
 Publius Ovidius Naso, The Epistles of Ovid. London. J. Nunn, Great-Queen-Street; R. Priestly, 143, High-Holborn; R. Lea, Greek-Street, Soho; and J. Rodwell, New-Bond-Street. 1813. Online version at the Perseus Digital Library.
 Tryphiodorus, Capture of Troy translated by Mair, A. W. Loeb Classical Library Volume 219. London: William Heinemann Ltd, 1928. Online version at theoi.com
 Tryphiodorus, Capture of Troy with an English Translation by A.W. Mair. London, William Heinemann, Ltd.; New York: G.P. Putnam's Sons. 1928. Greek text available at the Perseus Digital Library.

Set index articles on Greek mythology
Princesses in Greek mythology
Mortal women of Zeus
Lycians
Laconian characters in Greek mythology
Arcadian mythology
Lycia